Andrzej Olszowski (27 January 162129 August 1677) was a political speaker and writer. He was bishop of Chełmno from 1661 until 1674, and was archbishop of Gniezno and the primate of Poland from 1674.

Olszowski was born in Olszowa. He was provost of the Poznań cathedral chapter (1657-1667) and a Crown Deputy Chancellors in 1666-1676. He died in Gdańsk.

More important works and speeches

1. , no place of publication, 1658; ed. next: no place of publication, 1658 (with Dutch translation); no place of issue 1659; (Dutch translation: , 1658 - with Latin text)

2.  (several editions), other ed. 1669 (several editions (digital copy available)); transl. French pt. , 1669, ed. next: (1669), Cologne 1670; transl. Dutch , 1669

3. Polish speeches from 1649-1676 and others, ed.: J. S. Pisarski, vol. 2, Kalisz 1676; J. Daneykowicz Ostrowski, Polish and Latin swada, vol. 1, Lublin 1745

4.Latin Speeches from 1665-1674 and others, ed. J. C. Luenig, Vol. 2, Leipzig 1713; some speeches then came out separately; see Estreicher XXIII, 341-348

References

External links
 Virtual tour Gniezno Cathedral 
List of Primates of Poland 

1621 births
1677 deaths
17th-century Roman Catholic bishops in the Polish–Lithuanian Commonwealth
People from Strzelce County
17th-century Polish writers
Crown Vice-Chancellors